Armin Hodžić (born 17 November 1994) is a Bosnian professional footballer who plays as a forward for Bosnian Premier League club Željezničar.

Hodžić started his professional career at Željezničar, before joining Dinamo Zagreb in 2014. Four years later, he was transferred to Fehérvár, who loaned him to Kasımpaşa in 2020. In 2023, he returned to Željezničar.

A former youth international for Bosnia and Herzegovina, Hodžić made his senior international debut in 2016, earning 14 caps until 2020.

Club career

Early career
Hodžić started playing football at his hometown club Željezničar, before joining the youth academy of English team Liverpool in May 2011.

In the summer of 2012, he was sent on a season-long loan to his former club Željezničar. He made his professional debut against Slavija on 23 October at the age of 17. On 7 April 2013, he scored his first professional goal against the same opponent. In July, his loan was extended for an additional season. He scored his first career hat-trick against Leotar on 25 September.

Dinamo Zagreb
In May 2014, Hodžić signed a five-year deal with Croatian outfit Dinamo Zagreb. He made his official debut for the side in a Croatian Cup game against Istra 1961 on 12 February 2015. Two weeks later, he made his league debut against Split. On 3 March, he scored his first goal for Dinamo Zagreb. He won his first trophy with the club on 2 May, when they were crowned league champions.

On 25 July, he scored his first hat-trick for the team against Inter Zaprešić.

Hodžić debuted in the UEFA Champions League against Olympiacos on 20 October. Two weeks later, he scored his first goal in the competition against the same opposition.

In February 2017, he extended his contract until June 2022.

Hodžić played his 100th game for the club against Slaven Belupo on 4 March 2018.

Fehérvár
In August, Hodžić was transferred to Hungarian outfit Fehérvár for an undisclosed fee. He made his competitive debut for the side in a UEFA Europa League game against BATE Borisov on 20 September. A week later, he made his league debut against Mezőkövesd. On 31 October, he scored his first goal for Fehérvár in a Magyar Kupa game against Vác. Three days later, Hodžić scored his first league goal in a defeat to Paks. He won his first title with the club on 25 May 2019, by beating Honvéd in the Magyar Kupa final.

In October 2020, Hodžić was loaned to Turkish side Kasımpaşa until the end of season.

Return to Željezničar
On 10 February 2023, after weeks of speculation, Hodžić returned to Željezničar. He signed a six-month contract with the club, with an option to extend it at the end of the season. On 18 February, he made his first appearance, coming in as a substitute in a Bosnian Cup game against Leotar.

Hodžić scored his first goal for the club since returning on 28 February, in a cup game against Zvijezda Gradačac.

International career
Hodžić represented Bosnia and Herzegovina at all youth levels. He also served as captain of the under-21 team under coach Darko Nestorović.

In September 2015, he received his first senior call-up, for UEFA Euro 2016 qualifiers against Wales and Cyprus, but had to wait until 29 May 2016 to make his debut in a friendly game against Spain.

On 12 October 2019, in a UEFA Euro 2020 qualifier against Finland, Hodžić scored his first senior international goal.

Personal life
Hodžić is a practising Muslim; along with international teammates Ibrahim Šehić, Muhamed Bešić, Izet Hajrović, Sead Kolašinac, Edin Višća and Ervin Zukanović he visited a mosque in Zenica during national team concentration.

Career statistics

Club

International

Scores and results list Bosnia and Herzegovina's goal tally first, score column indicates score after each Hodžić goal.

Honours
Željezničar
Bosnian Premier League: 2012–13

Dinamo Zagreb
Croatian Football League: 2014–15, 2015–16, 2017–18
Croatian Cup: 2014–15, 2015–16, 2017–18

Fehérvár
Magyar Kupa: 2018–19

References

External links

1994 births
Living people
Footballers from Sarajevo
Bosniaks of Bosnia and Herzegovina
Bosnia and Herzegovina Muslims
Bosnia and Herzegovina footballers
Bosnia and Herzegovina youth international footballers
Bosnia and Herzegovina under-21 international footballers
Bosnia and Herzegovina international footballers
Bosnia and Herzegovina expatriate footballers
Association football forwards
FK Željezničar Sarajevo players
GNK Dinamo Zagreb players
Fehérvár FC players
Kasımpaşa S.K. footballers
Premier League of Bosnia and Herzegovina players
Croatian Football League players
Nemzeti Bajnokság I players
Süper Lig players
Expatriate footballers in Croatia
Expatriate footballers in Hungary
Expatriate footballers in Turkey
Bosnia and Herzegovina expatriate sportspeople in Croatia
Bosnia and Herzegovina expatriate sportspeople in Hungary
Bosnia and Herzegovina expatriate sportspeople in Turkey